{{Speciesbox
|image = Hymenoclea salsola close.jpg
|genus = Ambrosia
|species = salsola
|authority = (Torr. & A.Gray) Strother & B.G. Baldwin
|synonyms = *Ambrosia salsola var. fasciculata (A.Nelson) Strother & B.G.Baldwin
Ambrosia salsola var. pentalepis (Rydb.) Strother & B.G.Baldwin
Hymenoclea fasciculata A.Nelson
Hymenoclea pentalepis Rydb.
Hymenoclea salsola' Torr. & A. Gray  
Hymenoclea salsola var. fasciculata (Nelson) K.M.Peterson & W.W.Payne 	
Hymenoclea salsola var. patula (A.Nelson) K.M.Peterson & W.W.Payne
Hymenoclea salsola var. pentalepis (Rydb.) L.D.Benson
|synonyms_ref = The Plant List
}}Ambrosia salsola, commonly called cheesebush, winged ragweed, burrobush, white burrobrush, and desert pearl''', is a species of perennial shrub in the family Asteraceae native to deserts of the southwestern United States and northwestern Mexico.

This species, notable for its foul smell, easily hybridizes with the white bur-sage (Ambrosia dumosa).

Range and habitat
It is common on sandy desert flats, desert dry washes, and is weedy in disturbed sites in creosote bush scrub, shadscale scrub, Joshua tree woodland, and Pinyon juniper woodland, ranging from Inyo County, California, to northwestern Mexico.

It grows in sandy and gravelly soil, and sometimes on lava formations at elevations of .CONABIO. 2009. Catálogo taxonómico de especies de México. 1. In Capital Nat. México. CONABIO, Mexico City.

It is native to the southwestern United States (Arizona, California, Nevada, Utah) and northwestern Mexico (Sonora, Baja California, Baja California Sur), where it is a common plant of the local deserts, where it thrives on sandy soil, alkaline environments, and disturbed sites.Biota of North America Program 2013 county distribution map

Growth pattern
It is typically 2' to 3' in height.

This is a perennial shrub which forms a sprawling bush up to eight feet high.

Leaves and stems
It has thin stems and narrow, needlelike leaves.

The foliage and stem tips have a foul, pungent, cheese-like scent when crushed, a trait which gives the plant the common name "cheesebush".

Inflorescence, fruits, seeds
It flowers from March to June. Numerous small, cuplike male flowers grow in spike-like clusters above the female heads growing in the leaf axils.

All female (Pistillate) flower heads contain only one flower, while all male (staminate) heads may contain 5–15 flowers.

It is covered in plentiful white or yellow flowers and then pearly, winged fruits in white, yellow, or pink.

References

External links
     Calflora Database: Ambrosia salsola (Burrobrush)
Jepson Manual eFlora (TJM2) treatment
USDA, National Forest Service: Ecology of Ambrosia salsola

salsola
North American desert flora
Flora of the Southwestern United States
Flora of Northwestern Mexico
Flora of the California desert regions
Flora of the Great Basin
Flora of the Sonoran Deserts
Natural history of the Colorado Desert
Natural history of the Mojave Desert
Plants described in 1849
Taxa named by Asa Gray
Taxa named by John Torrey
Flora without expected TNC conservation status